Bodø Jazz Open is a jazz festival, presented at the end of January every year since 2011. The aim of the festival is to bring together local, national and international artists for collaborations, jam sessions and workshops. Every year between 2000 and 3000 festival participants visit the festival, and bring more life to Bodø in wintertime. Bodø Jazz Open brings jazz to Bodø's nightlife, and organizes gigs at local venues like Topp 13, Dama di, Paviljongen, Sinus, Bodø Kulturhus and Sydøst.

Biography 

Bodø Jazz Open was initially called Bodø International Jazz Festival, then Bodø Jazz Fest. In autumn 2010 it was proposed to change the name to Bodø Jazz Open. This name seemed more appropriate for a festival open to all genres and rhythmic expressions. Bodø Jazz Open was initiated in November 15, 2010 by Jan Gunnar Hoff, Tore Johansen and Erik Johansen. 
In 1921 'Bodø Jazz Band', with a lineup of 15 musicians, was established as the first jazz band in Bodø. Bodø Jazz Open took place for the first time in January 2011, and was a celebration of 90 years of jazz in Bodø. Since the city has a long tradition of jazz, it was a natural thing to establish a jazz festival here. Bodø's downtown is small, with hotels and airport easily accessible. This makes Bodø an ideal place for a jazz festival.

Concerts 
The number of events during the festival rose from 25 in 2011 to 33 in 2012. The goal for 2013 was not to increase the number of events, but to consolidate and ensure the quality of the festival. In addition to evening concerts Bodø Jazz Open also arranged gigs called "After Work Jazz". Musicians are set up in different cafés, and give free performances for café visitors and others who come by.

Bands and artists

2011 (January 26–29) 
  – Misvær Ska Forening
  – Hunting the light
  – Bugge Wesseltoft
  – FOCUS
  – Acuna/Hoff/Mathisen
  – Torun Eriksen w/ Bodø Big Band
  – Ole Hamre 
  – Slettens Merengue and Salsa-Prosjekt feat. Alex Acuna

2012 (January 25–28) 
  – Larry Carlton Quartet
 Marengue feat.  – Marilyn Mazur
  – Bodø Big Band
  – Marit Sandvik
  – Joddski
  – Henning Gravrok Band
  – Anders Jormin
  – Jan Gunnar Hoff
  – Arve Henriksen
  – Tom Waits Tribute
  – Audun Kleive
  – 120 days
  – Tore Johansen
  – Your Headlights Are On
  – Barnejazz with Espen Ruud and Nils Jansen
  – Jaga Jazzist
  – Gabriel
  – Kjell Nordeng

2013 (January 23–27) 
  – Mike Stern w/  – Jan Gunnar Hoff Quartet
  – Pushwagon
  – Oslo Strykekvartett
  – Arild Andersen w/ Bodø Rhythm Group and Bodø Big Band
  – Eivind Aarset
  – Oh!
  – JazzKamikaze
  – Tore Johansen
  – Sommerfuglfisk
  – Hanne Boel
  – Hanne Hukkelberg
  – Mambo Compañeros
  – Lisa Dillan / Rolf Lennart Stensø Duo

2014 (January 22–26) 
  – Terje Rypdal and   – Palle Mikkelborg w/ Bodø Big Band
  – Frode Alnæs Trio
  – LAVA
  – Petter Wettre and   – Jason Rebello
  – Steve Gadd

2015 (January 21–24) 
  – Jan Garbarek Group
  – Marilyn Mazur's Future Song w/  – Eivind Aarset, Nils Petter Molvær a.o.
  – Elle Marja Eira
  – Ole Jørn Myklebust and Roger Ludvigsen
  – Aleksander Kostopoulos
  – Mezzoforte
  – Knut Reiersrud
  – Arctic Philharmonic - for the second ever performance of  – Django Bates’ bass clarinet concerto, written for  – Håvard Lund

References

Eksterne lenker 

Jazz festivals in Norway
2011 establishments in Norway
Bodø
Culture in Nordland
Music festivals established in 2011
Annual events in Norway
Winter events in Norway